Theodor Seuss Geisel, better known as Dr. Seuss, published over 60 children's books over the course of his long career. Though most were published under his well-known pseudonym, Dr. Seuss, he also authored over a dozen books as Theo. LeSieg and one as Rosetta Stone.

As one of the most popular children's authors of all time, Geisel's books have topped many bestseller lists, sold over 222 million copies, and been translated into more than 15 languages. In 2000, when Publishers Weekly compiled their list of the best-selling children's books of all time, 16 of the top 100 hardcover books were written by Geisel, including Green Eggs and Ham, at number 4, The Cat in the Hat, at number 9, and One Fish Two Fish Red Fish Blue Fish, at number 13. In the years following his death in 1991, several additional books based on his sketches and notes were published, including Hooray for Diffendoofer Day! and Daisy-Head Mayzie. Although they were all published under the name Dr. Seuss, only My Many Colored Days, originally written in 1973, was entirely by Geisel.

Dr. Seuss books
The bulk of Theodor Seuss Geisel's books were published under the name of Dr. Seuss. The exceptions include Great Day for Up!, My Book about ME, Gerald McBoing Boing, The Cat in the Hat Beginner Book Dictionary (credited to the Cat himself), 13 books credited to Theo. LeSeig, Because a Little Bug Went Ka-Choo! and I Am Not Going to Get Up Today!, though all were in fact illustrated and written by Geisel. Note only first edition information is given.

The rights to the books and related media (films, TV shows, stage productions, exhibitions, digital media, licensed merchandise) and other strategic partnerships are owned by Dr. Seuss Enterprises.

Posthumous
Geisel also wrote several books that were posthumously published under his most recognizable pen name, Dr. Seuss.

Theo. LeSieg and Rosetta Stone
Geisel also authored several books under the pen name Theo. LeSieg (Geisel spelled backward) and one book under the name Rosetta Stone. These books were written but not illustrated by Geisel.

Theatrical
While Geisel was most famous for his literary works, he helped write several propaganda films, several cartoon shorts, and a feature-length film. Many of his literary works have also been adapted for the television and as feature-length films.

Theatrical short films

Feature film adaptations

Musicals

Television

Specials

Series

Direct-to-video
This Dr. Seuss collection was a series released by Random House. They are a video version of a "book on tape". None of these productions are animated. This section does not contain duplicate entries. While Horton Hatches The Egg, How The Grinch Stole Christmas, Horton Hears a Who, The Cat in the Hat, Green Eggs and Ham, and Because A Little Bug Went Ka-Choo! were adapted into full animation, they were also adapted into a non-animated production for this Dr. Seuss collection.

Dr. Seuss Beginner Book Video
 Dr. Seuss's ABC plus I Can Read with My Eyes Shut! and Mr. Brown Can Moo! Can You?
 Hop on Pop plus Oh Say Can You Say? and Marvin K. Mooney Will You Please Go Now! (mistakable VHS/DVD covers as Hop on Pop plus Marvin K. Mooney Will You Please Go Now! and Oh Say Can You Say?)
 One Fish, Two Fish, Red Fish, Blue Fish plus Oh, the Thinks You Can Think! and The Foot Book
 The Cat in the Hat Comes Back plus Fox in Socks and There's a Wocket in My Pocket! (mistakable VHS/DVD covers as The Cat in the Hat Comes Back plus There's a Wocket in My Pocket! and Fox in Socks)
 I Am Not Going to Get Up Today! plus The Shape of Me and Other Stuff, Great Day for Up! and In a People House (final VHS in Dr. Seuss's lifetime and mistakable credits as I Am Not Going to Get Up Today!, Great Day for Up!, The Shape of Me and Other Stuff and In a People House)
 2 Dr. Seuss Favorites: Green Eggs and Ham and The Cat in the Hat
The Cat in the Hat plus Maybe You Should Fly a Jet! Maybe You Should Be a Vet!
 Green Eggs and Ham plus The Tooth Book and Ten Apples up on Top! (mistakable VHS/DVD covers and VHS tapes as Green Eggs and Ham plus Ten Apples up on Top! and The Tooth Book)

Dr. Seuss Video Classics
 Circus Classics/Horton Hatches the Egg (narrated by Billy Crystal) plus If I Ran the Circus
 Treasury Classics/Yertle the Turtle and Other Stories (narrated by John Lithgow)
 Holiday Classics/How the Grinch Stole Christmas! (narrated by Walter Matthau) plus If I Ran the Zoo
 Big Animal Classics/Horton Hears a Who! (narrated by Dustin Hoffman) plus Thidwick the Big-Hearted Moose
 Lucky Classics/Did I Ever Tell You How Lucky You Are? (narrated by John Cleese) plus Scrambled Eggs Super!
 Bedtime Classics/Hunches in Bunches plus Dr. Seuss's Sleep Book (narrated by Madeline Kahn) (mistakable VHS/DVD covers, VHS tapes, DVD discs and credits as Dr. Seuss's Sleep Book [narrated by Madeline Kahn] plus Hunches in Bunches)

Other
 Notes Alive! Dr. Seuss's My Many Colored Days (1998) 
 Read with Me DVD! Green Eggs and Ham (2005)

Video games

 Dr. Seuss' Fix-Up the Mix-Up Puzzler (1984)
 Dr. Seuss's ABC (1995)
 Green Eggs and Ham (1996)
 The Cat in the Hat (1997)
 Dr. Seuss Toddler (1999)
 Dr. Seuss Preschool (1999)
 Dr. Seuss Kindergarten (1999)
 Dr. Seuss Reading (1999)
 The Grinch (2000)
 Green Eggs and Ham (2003)
 The Cat in the Hat (2003)
 The Cat in the Hat (2005)
 How the Grinch Stole Christmas! (2007) – Nintendo DS

Works withdrawn

On March 2, 2021, Seuss's birthday, Dr. Seuss Enterprises, ceased publishing and licensing six Dr. Seuss books because of imagery they deemed racist and insensitive. The six books are And to Think That I Saw It on Mulberry Street, If I Ran the Zoo, McElligot's Pool, On Beyond Zebra!, Scrambled Eggs Super! and The Cat's Quizzer.

The controversy dated back several years. The National Education Association's "Read Across America Day", moved away from Seuss's books and Seuss-themed activities in 2017, instead emphasizing works by and about people of color. Philip Nel of Kansas State University published Was the Cat in the Hat Black?: The Hidden Racism of Children's Literature, and the Need for Diverse Books in 2014, criticizing racial stereotypes in that and other Seuss books.

Many conservative media sources and public figures condemned the move, citing it as an example of cancel culture and literary censorship. The Wall Street Journal and National Review were among such critics, while Republican House Minority Leader Kevin McCarthy posted a video of him reading Green Eggs and Ham, in a reference to the news. Several non-conservative outlets also reacted negatively, with The Week referring to the move as "chilling".

The books' removal caused a surge in sales for other works by Seuss that impacted Amazon's charts in the United States. It was reported by CTV that nine of the top ten best sellers were all books by Seuss, excluding the books that were removed. As the collectors value of the withdrawn books rose substantially, eBay also delisted the books.

References

External links
 University of California San Diego's register of the materials in their Dr Seuss collection, detailing many of his works not published in (separate) books. 
 A (possibly incomplete) list of illustrated short stories Seuss published in Redbook Magazine in the 1950s. 
 

 
Bibliographies by writer
Bibliographies of American writers
Children's literature bibliographies
Poetry bibliographies